The Secretary of State for Education (SEE) is the second highest-ranking official within the Ministry of Education of Spain. It is a political appointment made by the Monarch on the advice of the minister in charge of the ministerial department.

The Secretary of State of Education has ultimate responsibility for the execution of Government policy over non-university education. He coordinates the Spanish education system that currently is delegated to the regions; he proposes the subjects of study (with the exception of the sport subjects that are under the jurisdiction of the Superior Sports Council and the vocational training subjects, competence of the General Secretariat for Vocational Training); he designs and directs scholarship and study aid programs; he promotes equality and non-discrimination policies in education; he oversees civil servants working in education and is also in charge of international relations regarding education on behalf of the Government.

The Secretariat of State controls two departments: the Directorate-General for Territorial Evaluation and Cooperation, the Directorate-General for Vocational Training and the Directorate-General for Educational Planning and Management.

History
The education ministry was created in Spain on March 31, 1900. However, the first department in charge of the education of citizens was created in the Constitution of 1812.

Since then, the objective of educating the population has never disappeared and has been maintained until the present day. The direct precursor of the Secretariat of State of Education is the General Secretariat of Education that was created on April 8, 1985 which assumed all the responsibilities for education.

In 1988, a new governmental restructuring created the current Secretariat of State of Education which took over the responsibilities of the old General Secretariat. The Secretary of State lost part of its responsibilities when, in 1992, the State delegated to its autonomous regions the responsibilities for education, maintaining at State level only the requirement to establish the basis of the education system and its coordination and the responsibility for universities and international treaties on educational matters.

In May 1996, the Secretariat of State was replaced by the General Secretariat of Education and Vocational Training but was restored in 1999. The same happened between 2004 and 2008.

Today, the Secretary of State has no responsibility for universities, because since 2018 they have been transferred to the resurrected Ministry of Science so the current responsibilities are limited to coordinating the education system, overseeing public servants, carrying out vocational training, making educational inspections to guarantee the compliance of the law and making international treaties about education.

In 2020, the Secretary of State, that from 2018 to 2020 was named Secretary of State for Education and Vocational Training, was renamed as Secretary of State for Education due to the creation of the General Secretariat for Vocational Training.

Structure
Under the Secretary of State are the following officials:
 The Director-General for Territorial Evaluation and Cooperation
 The Deputy Director-General for Territorial Cooperation and Educational Innovation.
 The official responsible the relations between the Ministry, the regional education departments and the private education centres; he helps the ministry in its responsibilities over the education of the autonomous cities of Ceuta and Melilla; he manages the education aid; he controls the education centres registry and establishes the legal framework for private, half-private/half-public and foreign education centres.
 The Deputy Director-General for Academic Organization.
 The official responsible for the non-university education management and its promotion; for university admission procedures along with the Ministry of Science, Innovation and Universities; for overseeing the issue of education titles; for directing the Central Registry of non-university degrees and the Registry of academic and non-university professionals degrees and the approval of foreign titles.
 The National Institute of Educational Evaluation.
 The department responsible for the general evaluation of the education system in coordination with its counterparts in the regions; for collaborating along with the Under Secretary in international agreements on the educational criteria for evaluation (especially with the European Union) and elaborating the State System of Education Indicators, in addition to doing studies and producing reports on how to improve the evaluation system.
 The National Institute of Educational Technologies and Teacher Training.
 The department responsible for the elaboration of educational materials which may help the teaching staff in its job; preparing programs in coordination with the regions to improve the training of the teaching staff; promoting the use of technologies in education and creating and maintaining portals of educational resources and social networks to promote the exchange of experiences and resources among teaching staff.
 The Director-General for Educational Planning and Management
 The External Educational Action Unit.
 The official responsible for the coordination of international relations on non-university education and vocational training, particularly in the European Union, assisting the Minister in his meetings at the EU Education Councils and for the management of education programs abroad and participation in the negotiation of international treaties in its area of responsibility.
 The Deputy Director-General for Scholarships, Study Aids and Educational Promotion.
 The official responsible for the design, planning and direction of education aids in coordination with the Ministry of Science, Innovation and Universities for all kind of students. He is also responsible for coordinating all aid programs (State-level programs and regional-level programs) and the promotion of action to improve the excellence of the students
 The Deputy Director-General for the European Social Fund in the Educational Sphere.
 The official responsible for the exercise of programming, management and control of European Social Fund aid in the period 2014-2020 and beyond, without prejudice to the closing operations of the 2007-2013 programming period which correspond directly to the Director-General of Vocational Training.
 The Deputy Director-General for Education Centers, Inspection and Programs.
It is responsible for the management of education infraestructure and the superior inspection of the education system.

List of Secretaries of State for Education

References

Secretaries of State of Spain